Vivaldi is a crater on Mercury. It was named by the IAU after Italian composer Antonio Vivaldi in 1976. It has a prominent and nearly continuous inner ring whose diameter measures about half that of the outer ring. It is one of 110 peak ring basins on Mercury. Unlike some of the lunar multiringed structures, no vestiges of additional rings are apparent around this crater. It is classified as c3 age.

References

Impact craters on Mercury
Vivaldi crater